The Colebrookdale Railroad, also known as the Secret Valley Line, is a tourist railroad located in the U.S. state of Pennsylvania. The railroad operates between Boyertown in Berks County and Pottstown in Montgomery County.

Operations
The Colebrookdale Railroad operates a variety of excursions originating out of Boyertown with plans to eventually have trains originating from Pottstown as well. The trains operated include a fall foliage train, Haunted History train, Santa Claus train, Valentine's Day train, Easter Bunny Express, Wine Tasting and Cheese Train, and Mother's Day and Father's Day trains. The railroad also allows groups to charter the entire train, or select cars, and to rent the caboose for birthday parties.

They currently operate a consist of 5 train cars; A deluxe coach, dining car, cafe car, lounge car, and parlor car. They also have an open air gondola and a PRR caboose. The fifth passenger car  entered service in mid-November 2020 and is a cross between a parlor car and a coach car. The deluxe coach, and parlor car are fully restored with their final interiors but the dining and cafe cars have yet to receive their final interiors.

Other cars that they own, but are not yet restored include a private car named , a baggage car that will eventually serve as a child entertainment center for the train, and an immigrant sleeper currently stored at their restoration shops named The Beaver. They are not currently planning on starting restoration on any of these cars for at least a few years.

History

The original Colebrookdale Railroad started building the railroad line between Boyertown and Pottstown in 1865 to serve the iron ore industry along the Manatawny Creek and trains started running on September 6, 1869. The line, which featured both freight and passenger service, originally continued further north to Bechtelsville and Barto before service was later cut back to Boyertown. The Colebrookdale Railroad was leased by the Reading Railroad who operated the line until 1976, when it became a part of Conrail. Conrail planned to abandon the line, but the Pennsylvania Department of Transportation acquired the line and hired operators. The line was operated by the Anthracite Railway, the Blue Mountain & Reading Railroad, and Penn Eastern Rail Lines. In March 2001, Berks County acquired the line for $155,000 to keep it active; the line was soon sold to Penn Eastern Rail Lines. The Colebrookdale Spur was abandoned by the East Penn Railroad (the successor to Penn Eastern Rail Lines) in 2008.The Berks County Redevelopment Authority reactivated the line, with the Eastern Berks Gateway Railroad appointed to operate the line beginning in October 2010. The company's non-profit parent, the Colebrookdale Railroad Preservation Trust, was working on developing freight traffic on the line. In 2011, a tourist railroad was proposed to operate on the line. Tourist passenger operations began in early October 2014 with a series of "soft" trips, intended to work out any operational issues before the first full season in 2015.

The Colebrookdale Railroad began regular tourist service on October 18, 2014.  In early 2020 the railroad operators requested $25 million from the county government for infrastructure improvements. The rail had to turn away freight business because tracks and bridges needed reinforcement to support the weight of modern railcars. They were approved for $40 million loan from the FRA starting in 2022 to completely rebuild the line and extend it to Bechtelsville.

As of 2022, the railroad has acquired two steam locomotives as part of their new steam program. In addition, the railroad is currently redeveloping their yard for more space to store their equipment, and they're transforming parts of their own parking lot into an Edwardian garden that will serve a variety of community events, as well as more parking space for their passengers.

Locomotive roster

Currently rostered units 
 Pennsylvania Railroad GP9 No. 7236. Built by EMD in 1959. Purchased by the Colebrookdale as a supposed replacement for No. 7580. It currently serves as the railroad's main workhorse, and it is the only unit in Colebrookdale colors.
 Southern Railway GP38-2 No. 5128. Built by EMD in 1974. It was retired from Norfolk Southern Railway and it has been used by Colebrookdale since 2019.
 Eastern Berks Gateway Railroad Plymouth ML-8 No. 9. Built by Plymouth in 1964. It has been serving as the railroad's yard switcher since 2015.
 Arizona Eastern Railway doodlebug railcar M-55.
 Grand Trunk Western 4-6-2 J-3b No. 5030. Built by the Baldwin locomotive Works in Philadelphia in 1912, rebuilt in the GTW service shops. It had been on static display in Jackson, Michigan for several years and was acquired by Colebrookdale in February 2021. It is in need of restoration but the particular date the locomotive will be restored is unknown.
 Lake Superior and Ishpeming 2-8-0 SC-4 No. 18. Built by the American Locomotive Company's (ALCO) Pittsburgh Works in 1910, rebuilt by the LS&I in 1930. It was previously operated by the defunct Rio Grande Scenic Railroad in Alamosa, Colorado before becoming inoperable, and was eventually purchased in March 2021 by the Maguire family foundation with the intention of restoring it to operation condition.

Formerly rostered units 

 Pennsylvania Railroad GP10 No. 7580. Built by EMD in 1957. It was the first locomotive to operate at the Colebrookdale, and it continued to do so until around 2015. It is currently owned by Steam into History in New Freedom, Pennsylvania.
 Transportation Corps 0-6-0 tank S100 No. 5002. Built by H.K. Porter, Inc. It was stored in Boyertown from 2015 to 2016 before being sold to BMG Railroad Contractors, who is currently restoring it to operating condition in Baraboo, Wisconsin.
Atchison, Topeka and Santa Fe CF7 No. 2627. Built by EMD in 1946, rebuilt by the Santa Fe in 1974. It was stored in Glasgow from 2016 to 2020 before being acquired by the Minnesota Transportation Museum, which is currently using it as a spare parts provider for their own F7A.

Rolling stock 

 Pennsylvania Railroad caboose No. 477768. Built by the PRR in 1941. Formerly used by the defunct Knox and Kane Railroad before becoming the very first piece of equipment to be owned by the Colebrookdale Railroad. It now serves as a private venue.
 The railroad rosters two 1916-built flatcars, one of which was converted to a gondola car to carry passengers.
 Canadian National Pullman Passenger car M520 No. 5038. It was previously used by the defunct Upper Hudson River Railroad before it was acquired by the Colebrookdale and converted into a dining car.
Canadian National Passenger car M500 No. 4970 Dawn Treader. Built by Pullman in 1919.
Canadian National Pullman passenger car M500 No. 5033 Storm King.
Maine Central lounge car. Built by Pullman in 1914. It sat hollow without wheels for several years before being completely rebuilt by the railroad for use on their consist. It was purchased from the Conway Scenic Railroad and entered service in November 2020.
Pennsylvania Railroad sleeping car No. 729 Lake Girard. Built by Pullman in 1924. It was converted to a maintenance of way car after being retired from passenger service. After spending several years on the Everett Railroad, the sleeping car was acquired by the Colebrookdale in 2015, and it has been in service since 2017.
The Beaver sleeping car. Built by Pullman in 1927. Former railroad unknown. It was acquired by the Colebrookdale in 2019 as their first sleeping car, and it is currently awaiting a thorough restoration to be used on the railroad's regular consist.
Business car M530 No. 4714 Joseph Early Widener Lynnewood. Built by Pullman in 1917. It was previously owned by Gaspe Rail for display in Gaspé, Quebec before it was acquired by the Colebrookdale.
Wabash observation car Diplomat. Built by Pullman in 1927. Previously owned by the Delmarva chapter of the National Railway Historical Society and the Eastern Shore Railway Museum in Parksley, Virginia, it is currently undergoing restoration by the Colebrookdale for future usage as a Christmas Carol-themed car for their Polar Bear train. It will subsequently go through a thorough restoration before being used as part of the railroad's regular consist.
Wheeling and Lake Erie Huron Palace passenger car. Built by Pullman in 1887. Previously owned by the defunct Indiana Transportation Museum in Noblesville, Indiana before being put at risk of getting cut up. The Colebrookdale acquired it last minute and is currently shipping it to Boyertown.

References

External links

Official website

Heritage railroads in Pennsylvania
Pennsylvania railroads
Railway companies established in 2014
2014 establishments in Pennsylvania
Tourist attractions in Berks County, Pennsylvania
Tourist attractions in Montgomery County, Pennsylvania